Gangu or Gangadhar Shastri Wabale was a Brahmin ruler of the Deccan. Ala-ud-din Hasan Bahman Shah, the founder of the Bahmani Sultanate, was a servant and general in his service.

Biography
Gangu was a Brahmin ruler of the Deccan. There is a popular legend regarding him narrated by the 17th century poet Ferishta, which says that Hasan Gangu (Ala-ud-Din Bahman Shah) was a servant of a brahmin ruler named Gangu (hence the name Hasan Gangu), who educated Hasan in Hinduism and made him a general in his army. Historians have not found any corroboration for the legend.

References

Works cited
 
 
 

Brahmins
Deccan Plateau
Bahmani Sultanate
History of India